Jutarnji list is a Croatian daily newspaper, founded and continuously published in Zagreb since 6 April 1998, by EPH (Europapress holding, owned by Ninoslav Pavić) which eventually changed name in Hanza Media, when bought by Marijan Hanžeković. The newspaper is published in the berliner format and online. Its online edition jutarnji.hr is the second most visited news website in Croatia after Index.hr.

According to the owner of Hanza Media Marijan Hanžeković, "Jutarnji list should be conceptually newspaper of liberal and social-democratic orientation, with emphasis on accuracy and relevance."

History and profile 
Jutarnji list was launched in April 1998, becoming the first successful Croatian daily newspaper to appear since the 1950s. It was named after a Zagreb daily that used to circulate from 1912 until 1941. The newspaper is part of Hanza Media media group.

Jutarnji is considered to be a more left-leaning liberal daily than Večernji list.

In 2003, Jutarnji list launched a comprehensive Sunday edition, Nedjeljni Jutarnji. On 19 February 2005, Jutarnji list published an exhaustive biography of Ante Gotovina.

The paper quickly took the majority of Croatian media market and became one of the most read newspapers in that country. In the first five years it sold more than 214 million copies. During the actual economic crisis the number of sold copies diminished from about 80,000 in 2007 to 52,763 in 2013. The crisis hit in the same manner other daily newspapers in Croatia. The circulation of  Jutarnji list was 66,000 copies in October 2014.

Personnel

Contributors (past and present) 
Writer Predrag Matvejević was an essayist at the Jutarnji list. Other notable contributors include Slavenka Drakulić, Igor Mandić, Ante Tomić, Jurica Pavičić, Nenad Polimac, Tvrtko Jakovina, Inoslav Bešker.

Editors-in-Chief 
 Tomislav Wruss (1998–2008)
 Mladen Pleše (2008–2013)
 Viktor Vresnik (2013–2015)
 Goran Ogurlić (since 2015)

Controversies 
In February 2008, Jutarnji list was involved in a scandal when it published an interview with what was thought to be Croatian Prime Minister Ivo Sanader. The reporter contacted 23-year-old Viktor Zahtila by e-mail and SMS, who he assumed to be the prime minister. Zahtila replied via email and nowhere explicitly stated that he was Ivo Sanader. The reporter, Davor Butković, never checked to see if he was actually communicating with the PM.

References

External links 
 

1998 establishments in Croatia
Newspapers established in 1998
Daily newspapers published in Croatia
Croatian-language newspapers
Mass media in Zagreb
Croatian news websites